Milton Conrad Schmidt (March 5, 1918 – January 4, 2017) was a Canadian professional ice hockey centre, coach and general manager, mostly for the Boston Bruins of the National Hockey League (NHL), where he was a member of the Kraut Line. He was elected to the Hockey Hall of Fame in 1961. In 2017, Schmidt was named one of the '100 Greatest NHL Players' in history.

Early years
Schmidt's early years were spent in Kitchener, where he attended King Edward Public School. In high school, he briefly attended Kitchener-Waterloo Collegiate and Vocational School, but dropped out at age 14 in order to work to support his family (his father had become too ill to work regularly), and took a job at a shoe factory. He made 18 cents per hour ($ per hour in  dollars) while working there and claimed that he knew the value of the dollar. He continued playing junior hockey with the Kitchener Empires and Kitchener Greenshirts. Schmidt was a childhood friend of fellow Hall of Famers Woody Dumart and Bobby Bauer. At the age of 20, while playing for the Boston Bruins' AHL farm team, the Providence Reds, Schmidt was invited to try out for the St. Louis Cardinals pro baseball team, but knew himself well enough from his youth baseball experience that while he could hit the ball out of the park, he would strike out many more times than hitting home runs.

Playing career

Playing
Schmidt played junior hockey with Dumart and Bauer in Kitchener, Ontario, before their rights were all acquired by the Bruins in 1935.  After playing a final year of junior hockey in Kitchener, Ontario, and half a year with the Providence Reds, Schmidt was called up to the Bruins during the 1937 season. He quickly proved himself to be a hardnosed centre, a skilled stickhandler and smooth playmaker.

Schmidt and his childhood friends Bauer and Dumart were teamed up together in the NHL as well. They formed the Kraut Line, and were a strong and dependable line for the Bruins for most of the following fifteen seasons. They were a key ingredient to the Bruins' success as they rampaged to the regular season title and a hard-fought Stanley Cup victory in 1939. The following season Schmidt became a star, as he led the league in scoring and guided the Bruins to another first-place finish and the third-most goals in team history to date.

The 1941 season saw Schmidt spearhead the Bruins to their second Cup win in three years.  However, the powerhouse Brown and Gold were decimated by World War II the following year as Schmidt, Bauer and Dumart enlisted in the Canadian military and superstar American goaltender Frank Brimsek enlisted with the United States Coast Guard. The Kraut Line found success playing hockey for the Ottawa RCAF team by winning the Allan Cup before heading overseas. Schmidt, Bauer and Dumart ultimately missed three productive NHL seasons due to their service in the War.

Schmidt returned for the beginning of the 1946 season. He resumed his starring ways and finished fourth in league scoring in 1947. Named captain in 1951, Schmidt won the Hart Trophy as the league's most valuable player that year.

In the later part of his career, Schmidt became friends with journalist Leo Monahan who travelled with the team on overnight train rides. One train ride Schmidt recalled that, "Leo was in the berth above me and I was down below. Throughout the night, he told me, he did not move for fear he would do something that would keep me awake".

Schmidt retired as a player partway through the 1954–1955 season to take over head coaching duties, replacing Lynn Patrick.

Coaching
Schmidt coached the Bruins up to the 1966 season with a year and a half hiatus, leading them to the Stanley Cup Finals in 1957 and 1958. He also was Boston's assistant general manager.

After coaching the Bruins for 11 seasons Schmidt was promoted to the general manager position in 1967 just as the league ushered in six new franchises, doubling in size.  Schmidt proved to be a great architect in the new era of the NHL, acquiring and drafting several key players to build a Bruins team that won two more Stanley Cups in 1970 and 1972.  His biggest deal was a blockbuster as he acquired Phil Esposito, Ken Hodge and Fred Stanfield from the Chicago Black Hawks in exchange for Pit Martin, Gilles Marotte and Jack Norris.

After his long and loyal career in the Bruins organization, Schmidt left the team to become the first General Manager of the expansion Washington Capitals on April 20, 1973. Unfortunately for Schmidt, the Capitals set a benchmark in futility that still stands as an NHL record today, as the new franchise finished the year with a minuscule 21 points with the worst record in the 18-team league (8–67–5).

Career playing statistics

* Stanley Cup Champion.

Career coaching record

Retirement and death
Schmidt was inducted into the Hockey Hall of Fame in 1961 and his #15 jersey retired by the Bruins. After his retirement from hockey management, Schmidt remained involved with the Bruins through their alumni team and as manager of the Boards and Blades Club at the Boston Garden. On October 6, 2010, the Bruins celebrated Schmidt's 75 years with the team during Milt Schmidt Night. On this night he received 2 commemorative Stanley Cup miniatures to represent the two cups he had brought to the club, plus he personally raised his number to the rafters inside TD Garden.  He was the last surviving member of both the Bruins' 1939 and 1941 Stanley Cup teams.  Schmidt was also the last living NHL player to play in the 1930s and the last to have played against the Montreal Maroons (a team that folded in 1938).

On October 20, 2016, Schmidt along with Bobby Orr dropped the ceremonial puck at the Boston Bruins' first home game of the season.

Schmidt died after a stroke on January 4, 2017, in a retirement facility in Westwood, Massachusetts; at the age of 98; at the time of his death he was the oldest living former NHL player, and the last living player from the AHL's inaugural season. Following Schmidt's death, Chick Webster became the oldest living NHL player.  Schmidt is buried alongside his wife at the Highland Cemetery in Dover, Massachusetts.

Tribute
Upon hearing of Schmidt's death, NHL Commissioner Gary Bettman issued the following statement: "It would be a challenge to find anyone who took greater pride in being a Boston Bruin than Milt Schmidt did--be it as a player, an executive or an ambassador over the 80-plus years he served the franchise, the city of Boston and the National Hockey League.  Milt's respect for the game was matched by his humility and was mirrored by the great respect with which his opponents, and generations of Bruins players, treated him through the years."

Awards and achievements
 Stanley Cup champion - all with Boston (1939 and 1941 as a player), (1970 and 1972 as general manager)
 Finished his career with 229 goals and 346 assists for 575 points in 776 games.
 At the time of his retirement, was fourth in NHL history in points scored and third in assists.
 Named to the NHL First All-Star Team in 1940, 1947 and 1951.
 Named to the NHL Second All-Star Team in 1952.
 Played in NHL All-Star Game in 1947, 1948, 1951 and 1952.
 Won the Lester Patrick Trophy for contributions to hockey in 1996.
 Was the last active NHL player who played during the 1930s.
 In 1998, he was ranked number 27 on The Hockey News' list of the 100 Greatest Hockey Players.
 Won the Hart Trophy in 1951.
 NHL Scoring Champion in 1940.
 The first former player to win a Stanley Cup with the same franchise as their general manager (1970), an achievement only matched by Serge Savard (1986) and Joe Sakic (2022).
 In January 2017, Schmidt was part of the first group of players to be named one of the '100 Greatest NHL Players' in history.

References

NESN October 28, 2010

External links
 

1918 births
2017 deaths
Boston Bruins captains
Boston Bruins coaches
Boston Bruins executives
Boston Bruins players
Canadian ice hockey centres
Royal Canadian Air Force personnel of World War II
Canadian people of German descent
Hart Memorial Trophy winners
Hockey Hall of Fame inductees
Ice hockey people from Ontario
Kitchener Greenshirts players
Lester Patrick Trophy recipients
National Hockey League executives
National Hockey League players with retired numbers
National Hockey League scoring leaders (prior to 1947–48)
Sportspeople from Kitchener, Ontario
Stanley Cup champions
Washington Capitals coaches
Washington Capitals executives
Canadian ice hockey coaches